Lugny-Champagne is a commune in the Cher department in the Centre-Val de Loire region of France.

Geography

Population

Sights
 The church of St. Fiacre, dating from the 15th century
 The château de Billeron, 18th century

See also
Communes of the Cher department

References

Communes of Cher (department)